C More First was a Scandinavian premium television channel owned by C More Entertainment showing movies and TV shows. It is the flagship movie channel of the Nordic C More package.

History
The channel started out as Canal+ Film 1 in May 2004 and replaced the channel Canal+ Gul. From September 2005 the channel was known as Canal+ Film, but the numeral was added again in November 2006. On 1 November 2007 the channel became Canal+ First as part of a major reorganisation of the Canal+ movie channels. The channel changed its name to C More First on 4 September 2012. It was shut down on 1 September 2019.

Programming
List of programs broadcast by C More

See also 
 C More Entertainment
 C More First HD
 C More Hits
 C More Action
 C More Sport
 C More Tennis

Pan-Nordic television channels
TV4 AB

Defunct television channels in Sweden
Defunct television channels in Norway
Defunct television channels in Denmark
Defunct television channels in Finland
Television channels and stations established in 2004